A Delivery Bar Code Sorter (DBCS) is a mail sorting machine used primarily by the United States Postal Service. Introduced in 1990, these machines sort letters at a rate of approximately 36,000 pieces per hour, with a 99% accuracy rate. A computer scans the addresses of the mail, and sorts it to one of up to 286 pockets, setting it up for delivery by the letter carrier.

References

Machines
Mail sorting
United States Postal Service